This is a list of notable converts to Christianity from Sikhism
 Jasvinder Sanghera- British activist against forced marriages
 Bakht Singh - Indian Christian
Gurmit Singh - Singaporean actor of Indian, Chinese and Japanese descent, known for his role in Phua Chu Kang as the title character
 Sadhu Sundar Singh - Indian Christian
Nikki Haley - Former Governor of South Carolina

References

 Sikhism
C